Julia Soek (born 12 December 1990) is a Dutch former racing cyclist, who last rode for UCI Women's WorldTeam . She competed in the 2013 UCI women's team time trial in Florence. In September 2021 Soek announced that she would retire from competition at the end of the season. The following month it emerged that she would join  as a directeur sportif for 2022. In the same year she followed a directeur sportif course at the World Cycling Centre in Switzerland. In 2023 she joined the new Dutch continental tour team Tour de Tietema-Unibet as directeur sportif.

Major results

2015
 1st  Sprints classification Energiewacht Tour
2016
 8th Crescent Vårgårda UCI Women's WorldTour
2017
 1st Erondegemse Pijl
2018
 1st Stage 1 (TTT) Giro Rosa

See also
 2014 Team Giant-Shimano season

References

External links

1990 births
Living people
Dutch female cyclists
Sportspeople from Groningen (city)
Cyclists from Groningen (province)
21st-century Dutch women